Unai Marrero Larrañaga (born 9 October 2001) is a Spanish professional footballer who plays as a goalkeeper for Real Sociedad B.

Club career
Born in San Sebastián, Gipuzkoa, Basque Country, Marrero joined Real Sociedad's youth setup in 2016, from CD Lagun Onak. He made his senior debut with the C-team on 14 September 2019, starting in a 1–2 Tercera División away loss against Pasaia KE.

Marrero made his professional debut with the reserves on 10 October 2021, coming on as a first-half substitute for outfield player Jon Karrikaburu as Andoni Zubiaurre was sent off in a 1–1 home draw against SD Ponferradina in the Segunda División.

References

External links

2001 births
Living people
Footballers from San Sebastián
Spanish footballers
Association football goalkeepers
Segunda División players
Segunda Federación players
Tercera División players
Real Sociedad C footballers
Real Sociedad B footballers